Sir Cyril Smith (1928–2010) was a British Liberal Democrat politician.

Cyril Smith may also refer to:

 Cyril Stanley Smith (1903–1992), British metallurgist and historian of science
 Cyril Smith (actor) (1892–1963), British actor
 Cyril Smith (cricketer) (1926–2009), Queensland opening bowler
 Cyril Smith (pianist) (1909–1974), English classical pianist
 Cyril Smith (Marxist) (1929–2008), British lecturer of statistics, socialist and revolutionary humanist
 Cyril Smith (footballer) (born 1893), Welsh footballer